Mach 5 or variation, may refer to:

 Mach 5 (speed), a mach number representing the delimiting speed separating supersonic speed (below Mach 5) from hypersonic speed (above Mach 5), 5 times the speed of sound
 Mach Five, a racing car in the Speed Racer franchise
 Mach-V, an alias of the Marvel Comics character Abner Jenkins
 "Mach 5" (song), a 1996 song by alternative rock band The Presidents of the United States of America
 Wharfedale MACH 5, a loudspeaker in the Wharfedale MACH series
 PowerPC 604ev (codenamed "Mach 5"), a CPU found in Apple Macintosh computers, see PowerPC 600

See also

 
 
 
 Mach (disambiguation)
 Mach number